İkizkuyu is a village in the Oğuzeli District, Gaziantep Province, Turkey. The village is inhabited by Turkmens of the Barak tribe and Abdals of the Kara Hacılar tribe.

References

Villages in Oğuzeli District